Leonid Marinich is a Belarusian diplomat serving as ambassador extraordinary and plenipotentiary of Belarus to Uzbekistan. He was appointed on 5 March 2018 by president Alexander Lukashenko. He previously worked as First Deputy Minister of Agriculture and Food.

References 

Living people
Belarusian diplomats
Ambassadors of Belarus to Uzbekistan
Year of birth missing (living people)